Trtnik is a small village southwest of Podbrdo in the Municipality of Tolmin in the Littoral region of Slovenia.

References

External links
Trtnik on Geopedia

Populated places in the Municipality of Tolmin